The city of Kyoto in Kyoto Prefecture, Japan has eleven wards.

Unlike the 23 special wards of Tokyo, the wards of Kyoto are not separate municipalities, they are divisions just for municipal administration. Together, they comprise the city of Kyoto, under a single mayor and city council.

References